The CAF first round of 2022 FIFA World Cup qualification was played from 4 to 10 September 2019.

Format
A total of 28 teams (teams ranked 27–54 in the CAF entrant list) played home-and-away over two legs. The 14 winners advanced to the second round.

Seeding
The draw for the first round was held on 29 July 2019 at 12:00 EST (UTC+2), at the CAF headquarters in Cairo, Egypt.

The seeding was based on the FIFA World Rankings of July 2019 (shown in parentheses below). Teams from Pot 2 hosted the first leg, while teams from Pot 1 hosted the second leg.

Note: Bolded teams qualified for the second round.

Summary
The first legs were played on 4–7 September, and the second legs on 8 and 10 September 2019.

Matches

1–1 on aggregate. Ethiopia won on away goals and advanced to second round.

Zimbabwe won 3–2 on aggregate and advanced to second round.

Namibia won 4–1 on aggregate and advanced to second round.

2–2 on aggregate. Tanzania won 3–0 on penalties and advanced to second round.

Djibouti won 2–1 on aggregate and advanced to second round.

Malawi won 1–0 on aggregate and advanced to second round.

Angola won 3–1 on aggregate and advanced to second round.

Liberia won 3–2 on aggregate and advanced to second round.

Mozambique won 3–0 on aggregate and advanced to second round.

Guinea-Bissau won 3–1 on aggregate and advanced to second round.

Equatorial Guinea won 2–1 on aggregate and advanced to second round.

Togo won 3–1 on aggregate and advanced to second round.

Sudan won 3–1 on aggregate and advanced to second round.

Rwanda won 10–0 on aggregate and advanced to second round.

Goalscorers

Notes

References

External links

Qualifiers – Africa Matches: Round 1, FIFA.com

1
Qual
FIFA World Cup qualification, CAF Round 1